The Pakistan Karate Federation is the national governing body to develop and promote the sport of Karate in the Pakistan.

Affiliations
The Federation is affiliated with:
 World Karate Federation
 Asian Karatedo Federation
 Pakistan Olympic Association
 Pakistan Sports Board

National Championship
Karate is the regular event of National Games, the federation also organizes National karate championship.

References

External links
 Official Website

Sports governing bodies in Pakistan
Karate organizations
Karate in Pakistan
Sports organizations established in 1988
1988 establishments in Pakistan